Haplochromis occultidens is a species of cichlid endemic to Lake Kivu on the border of the Democratic Republic of the Congo and Rwanda.  This species can reach a length of  SL.

References

occultidens
Fish described in 1988
Taxonomy articles created by Polbot